Nashville Skyline is the ninth studio album by American singer-songwriter Bob Dylan, released on April 9, 1969, by Columbia Records as LP record, reel to reel tape and audio cassette.

Building on the rustic style he experimented with on John Wesley Harding, Nashville Skyline displayed a complete immersion into country music. Along with the more basic lyrical themes, simple songwriting structures, and charming domestic feel, it introduced audiences to a radically new singing voice from Dylan, who had temporarily quit smoking—a soft, affected country croon.

The result received a generally positive reaction from critics, and was a commercial success. Reaching  in the U.S., the album also scored Dylan his fourth UK No. 1 album.

Background 
The concept of recording a country album in Nashville was first discussed with Dylan in 1965 by Johnny Cash, who expressed interest in producing such an album. "I've got my own ideas about that Nashville sound and I'd like to try it with Bob," Cash said in a March 1965 interview with Music Business magazine. Those sessions never materialized and by June of that year, Dylan was going fully electric with the recording of Highway 61 Revisited. By the time Nashville Skyline was recorded, the political climate in the United States had grown more polarized. In 1968, civil rights leader Martin Luther King Jr. and Senator Robert F. Kennedy (a leading candidate for the presidency) were assassinated. Riots broke out in most major American cities, including a major one surrounding the Democratic National Convention in Chicago and racially motivated conflagrations spurred by King's assassination. A new president, Richard Nixon, was sworn into office in January 1969, but the U.S. engagement in Southeast Asia, particularly the Vietnam War, would continue for several years. Protests over a wide range of political topics became more frequent. Dylan had been a leading cultural figure, noted for political and social commentary throughout the 1960s. Even as he moved away from topical songs, he never lost his cultural stature. However, as Clinton Heylin wrote of Nashville Skyline, "If Dylan was concerned about retaining a hold on the rock constituency, making albums with Johnny Cash in Nashville was tantamount to abdication in many eyes."

"Our generation owes him our artistic lives," observed Kris Kristofferson, who later sang with Cash in The Highwaymen, "because he opened all the doors in Nashville when he did Blonde on Blonde and Nashville Skyline. The country scene was so conservative until he arrived. He brought in a whole new audience. He changed the way people thought about it – even the Grand Ole Opry was never the same again."

Helped by a promotional appearance on The Johnny Cash Show on June 7, Nashville Skyline went on to become one of Dylan's best-selling albums. Three singles were pulled from it, all of which received significant airplay on AM radio.

Critical reception and legacy

Despite the dramatic, commercial shift in direction, the press also gave Nashville Skyline a warm reception. A critic for Newsweek wrote of "the great charm... and the ways Dylan, both as composer and performer, has found to exploit subtle differences on a deliberately limited emotional and verbal scale." In Rolling Stone, Paul Nelson wrote, "Nashville Skyline achieves the artistically impossible: a deep, humane, and interesting statement about being happy. It could well be... his best album." However, Nelson would reconsider his opinion in a review for Bob Dylan's Greatest Hits Vol. II less than three years later, writing, "I was misinformed. That's why no one should pay any attention to critics, especially the artist." In The Village Voice, Robert Christgau argued that "the beauty of the album" was in the "totally undemanding" and "one-dimensional" quality of the songs, believing Dylan had toyed with the public's expectations again by embracing a country tenor voice and aesthetic. He later included it in his "Basic Record Library" of 1950s and 1960s recordings, published in Christgau's Record Guide: Rock Albums of the Seventies (1981). It was voted number 579 in the third edition of Colin Larkin's All Time Top 1000 Albums (2000).

A few critics expressed some disappointment. Ed Ochs of Billboard wrote, "the satisfied man speaks in clichés, and blushes as if every day were Valentine's Day." Tim Souster of the BBC's The Listener magazine wrote, "One can't help feeling something is missing. Isn't this idyllic country landscape too good to be true?"

Hip hop group Public Enemy reference it in their 2007 Dylan tribute song "Long and Whining Road": "Fans, if it's not for you, there'd be no PE / From the Nashville Skyline, to the homeboys and girls of South Country".

Track listing
All songs written by Bob Dylan.

Personnel

Musicians
 Bob Dylan – guitar, harmonica, vocals
 Norman Blake – guitar, Dobro
 Kenneth A. Buttrey – drums, bongos, cowbell
 Johnny Cash – vocals and guitar on "Girl from the North Country"
 Fred Carter Jr. – guitar
 Charlie Daniels – bass guitar, guitar
 Pete Drake – pedal steel guitar
 Marshall Grant – bass guitar on "Girl from the North Country"
 W. S. Holland – drums on "Girl from the North Country"
 Charlie McCoy – guitar, harmonica
 Bob Wilson – organ, piano
 Bob Wootton – electric guitar on "Girl from the North Country"

Production
Bob Johnston – production
 Charlie Bragg – engineering
 Neil Wilburn – engineering
Elliot Landy - photographer front cover
Al Clayton - photographer back cover

Charts

Weekly charts

Singles

Certifications

References

1969 albums
Albums produced by Bob Johnston
Bob Dylan albums
Columbia Records albums